Alan Mackay-Sim  (16 May 1951 – 4 January 2023) was an Australian biomedical scientist specialising in adult stem cell research, and winner of the 2017 Australian of the Year. Some of his research focused on olfactory ensheathing cells, which are cells in the human nose that interact with the nervous system to cause a sense of smell.

His research into stem cells contributed to the treatment of spinal cord injuries. The restoration of mobility to Darek Fidyka, a Polish paraplegic man, used research by Mackay-Sim.

Academic and professional life
Mackay-Sim received his PhD from Macquarie University in 1980, then subsequently studied at the University of Pennsylvania and the University of Wyoming.

Mackay-Sim was the director of the National Centre for Adult Stem Cell Research at Griffith University before his retirement in 2015.

Personal life 
Mackay-Sim was born on 16 May 1951. He grew up in Roseville, New South Wales, the third of four brothers. He attended North Sydney Boys High School.

Mackay-Sim was married, with two children.

In 2015, he was diagnosed with multiple myeloma, and was treated with stem cell transplant.

Mackay-Sim retired in 2015, and lived in Currimundi, Queensland. He died on 4 January 2023, at the age of 71.

Awards
 Member of the Order of Australia, for "significant service to tertiary education, and to biomedical science", in the 2021 Queen's Birthday Honours.

 Australian of the Year, 2017
 Queenslander of the Year, 2003

References

External links 
 Professor Alan Mackay-Sim at Griffith University
 

1951 births
2023 deaths
People with multiple myeloma
Stem cell researchers
Australian medical researchers
Australian of the Year Award winners
Academic staff of Griffith University
Macquarie University alumni
Members of the Order of Australia
University of Pennsylvania alumni
University of Wyoming alumni
People educated at North Sydney Boys High School
Australian republicans